Leiocithara porcellanea is a species of sea snail, a marine gastropod mollusk in the family Mangeliidae.

Description
The length of the shell attains 9.1 mm, its diameter 3.8 mm. It is closely related to Leiocithara lischkei (E. A. Smith, 1888) from Japan, but otherwise it displays shell characters of both Leiocithara and Citharomangelia.

Distribution
This species occurs off Zululand, South Africa, at depths between 75 m and 160 m.

References

 Kilburn R.N. 1992. Turridae (Mollusca: Gastropoda) of southern Africa and Mozambique. Part 6. Subfamily Mangeliinae, section 1. Annals of the Natal Museum, 33: 461–575

External links
  Tucker, J.K. 2004 Catalog of recent and fossil turrids (Mollusca: Gastropoda). Zootaxa 682:1–1295.
 

Endemic fauna of South Africa
porcellanea
Gastropods described in 1992